Central Modern School is an English-medium co-educational day boarding (private) school located in Baranagar, West Bengal, India. The school educates pupils from the Pre-Preparatory class to the 12th grade. The school is affiliated with the Council for the Indian School Certificate Examinations (CISCE), New Delhi.

It was established in 1988 by founding father Mr Chittajit De.

History 
Established in 1988 as a Montessori School, followed closely by affiliation to the Council For The Indian School Certificate Examinations (CISCE), New Delhi, in 1992, Central Modern School emerged in the early 2000s as a Higher Secondary English Medium School with its own multi-storey building and assembly hall. Central Modern School's grew under its then Principal and Founder of the school - Mr Chittajit De. The school focuses on holistic education, with various extra-curricular activities like debates, arts, MUNs, dramatics, dancing etc.

Early in the year 2005, Mr Nabarun De became the Principal of the institution. Mr. De became the Convener of his zone, followed by the Secretary of the ASISC (WB and NE Chapter), Joint Secretary of the ASISC (National), Secretary of the West Bengal Private School's Association, and finally the Member of the General Body and executive committee of the CISCE, New Delhi, in just a short span of fifteen years from his appointment to office as the Principal of Central Modern School. In the year 2015, Mr De re-established the school a new five-acre campus. 

Mr Nabarun De passed away in September, 2020.

Motto 
The school motto - “Learning for Liberation”, making quality education affordable.

Academic achievement 

 The school secured third rank among the ICSE results for 2013.

Extra-curricular activities 
The school hosts various extra-curricular activities like debates, chess, arts and craft, MUNs, dramatics, dancing etc. throughout the year. The school exhibitions provide opportunities for students to display their creativity and talents.

Sports are highly encouraged amongst students, with tournaments in football, cricket, kabaddi and throw-ball.

Seminars and workshops are organised for parents to emphasise on development of students.

School Houses 
The House system in school has a significant role in both the curricular and co-curricular spheres of the students. The weekly House Activity class promotes newspaper reading and trains students in Public speaking ability.

References

External links 

 https://www.centralmodernschool.in
 https://admission.cms.offbeateducation.com/

Primary schools in West Bengal
High schools and secondary schools in West Bengal
Schools in North 24 Parganas district
Educational institutions established in 1980
1980 establishments in West Bengal
Baranagar